Fram Mesa is a high, ice-capped mesa,  long and  wide, that forms the northeastern portion of Nilsen Plateau in the Queen Maud Mountains of Antarctica. The feature may have been seen by Amundsen in 1911, and it was observed and partially mapped by the Byrd Antarctic Expeditions of 1928–30 and 1933–35. It was mapped in detail by the United States Geological Survey from surveys and U.S. Navy air photos, 1960–64, and was named by the Advisory Committee on Antarctic Names after the Fram, the ship used by Amundsen's South Pole expedition of 1910–12.

References 

Mesas of Antarctica
Landforms of the Ross Dependency
Amundsen Coast